The 1967 European Cup was the 2nd edition of the international team competition in athletics between European nations, organised by the European Athletic Association.

The tournament consisted of three sections. Three preliminary competitions were held for men's teams of smaller nations on 24–25 June, held in Copenhagen, Athens and Dublin. Netherlands, Switzerland and Belgium progressed to the next round as winners. Three semi-finals were conducted for both men's and women's teams, with the men's held on 22–23 July in Ostrava, Duisburg and Stockholm, and the women's was held on 16 July Dresden, Oslo and Wuppertal . The top two teams in each semi-final qualified for the Finals held in Kyiv, Soviet Union.

Final
Held in Kyiv on 15 September (women) and on 16–17 September (men).

Team standings

Results summary

Men's events

Women's events

Semifinals

Men
All semifinals were held on 22 and 23 July.

Semifinal 1
Held in Ostrava

Semifinal 2
Held in Duisburg

Semifinal 3
Held in Stockholm

Women
All semifinals were held on 16 July.

Semifinal 1
Held in Dresden

Semifinal 2
Held in Wuppertal

Semifinal 3
Held in Oslo

Preliminaries

Men
All preliminaries were held on 24–25 June.

Preliminary 1
Held in Copenhagen

Preliminary 2
Held in Athens

Preliminary 3
Held in Dublin

References

Full Results. Sport Olympic. Retrieved 2020-10-24.
European Cup results (Men) from GBR Athletics
European Cup results (Women) from GBR Athletics

European Cup (athletics)
European Cup
1967 in Soviet sport
International athletics competitions hosted by the Soviet Union
International athletics competitions hosted by Ukraine
Sports competitions in Kyiv